Magnus Gällerdal (born 10 August 1979) is a Swedish equestrian. He competed at the 2004 Summer Olympics and the 2008 Summer Olympics.

References

External links
 

1979 births
Living people
Swedish male equestrians
Olympic equestrians of Sweden
Equestrians at the 2004 Summer Olympics
Equestrians at the 2008 Summer Olympics
Sportspeople from Linköping